Ivato International Airport  is the main international airport serving Antananarivo, the capital of Madagascar, located  northwest of the city centre.  Ivato Airport is the main hub for Air Madagascar and is located in the commune of Ivato.

History

Ivato has been the main airport of Antananarivo since the 1960s; civil and military mixed platform and main hub of Air Madagascar.

Madagascar's deadliest aviation accident occurred at the airport on July 19, 1967. A Douglas DC-4 of Air Madagascar departing for Antsiranana touched the ground 720 meters past the runway, briefly became airborne but crashed again just over 500 meters later, killing 42 of the 77 onboard. Among the dead was foreign minister Albert Sylla.

It has two main terminals: one terminal for domestic flights and one terminal for international flights. In December 2021, a new terminal opened.

In 2016, 845,000 passengers passed through the airport.

Airlines and destinations

Turkish Airlines to and from Istanbul makes a stopover in Mauritius. However, Turkish Airlines has no traffic rights between Antananarivo and Mauritius.

Air Madagascar operates to Guangzhou with a stopover in Reunion.

References

External links

(Madagascar Airport Departures Arrivals live)

Airports in Madagascar
Buildings and structures in Antananarivo
Ivato